Flamingo is a fictional supervillain appearing in American comic books published by DC Comics, commonly as an adversary of Batman.

The character appeared on the second season of Gotham, portrayed by Raúl Castillo.

Publication history
Flamingo first appeared in Batman #666 (July 2007) and was created by Grant Morrison and Frank Quitely.

Fictional character biography
Eduardo Flamingo is an emotionless, unfeeling killer who has a tendency to eat his victim's faces after he has murdered them. Jason Todd (the second Robin, who had become Red Hood) has rallied a defense against Flamingo, but sustains bullet wounds to the face and knee-cap. Flamingo then turns his attentions to Red Hood's partner Scarlet. Flamingo then tugs at the seams of Scarlet's mask before she gashes him with one of her blades. Feeling responsible for the girl and her condition, Robin jumps into the fray to help, but receives four bullets to his cape-protected spine, paralyzing him from the waist down. Dick Grayson (who is operating as Batman) delivers a boot to Flamingo's face. When Dick is nearly tossed over the side of the building, Jason uses a construction digger to scoop Flamingo up and deposit him over the edge, sending him plummeting to the Earth below. Commissioner James Gordon later tells Batman that Flamingo's body was never found.

In 2011, "The New 52" rebooted the DC universe. Flamingo is first seen among the villainous inmates at Arkham Asylum. He joins the inmates and is seen attacking the Batman before Joker (who was actually Nightwing in disguise) appears to come to Batman's aid and the pair work together to beat back the group of rampaging inmates.

During the "Forever Evil" storyline, Flamingo appears as a member of the Crime Syndicate of America's incarnation of the Secret Society of Super Villains.

During the "Gothtopia" storyline, Flamingo was later seen among those who have taken over Arkham Asylum. He and Nocturna later get knocked out by Batman.

While Batman is teased by Julia about his romantic failure with Catwoman, he gets distracted when Flamingo's motorcycle skids past him. Batman makes a hurried u-turn and catches up to his prey, running him down, and sending the assassin flying from his bike. He has taken down Flamingo and allows the man to wake in a cemetery. Batman watches Flamingo get up and leave, in order that he can follow him back to his employer. En route, Flamingo receives an invitation to Catwoman's impending murder. Batman follows Flamingo to the Moffat Building, where he discovers the aftermath of the shooting. Dragos Ibanescu lies dead and both Catwoman and Killer Croc are traumatized by Jade McKillen's death.

Powers and abilities
Flamingo does not have any powers, but he is a skilled hitman, in excellent physical condition. He wields a variety of weapons, from chain whips to sub-machine guns. He also drives a variety of vehicles, though the most common is a bright pink motorcycle.

Other versions

Batman in Bethlehem
15 years into the future as part of the Batman in Bethlehem story, Flamingo appears as an enemy of Damian Wayne (who has become the third Batman). He is shown sneaking up on Batman only for him to throw a Batarang at Flamingo's face.

In other media
 Flamingo appears in the Batman: The Brave and the Bold episode "The Knights of Tomorrow!". He is among the defeated villains in a montage of Batman and Robin's victories, although the events of the episode turned out to be part of a book that Alfred Pennyworth was writing called "The Knights of Tomorrow".
 Eduardo Flamingo made his live-action debut in season 2 of Gotham, portrayed by Raúl Castillo. This version is a spike-welding cannibal and one of Gotham City's deadliest hitmen who sees killing as an art form. Eduardo Flamingo first appears in "Rise of the Villains: A Bitter Pill to Swallow" where he is killing one of his targets. He is then hired by the "Lady" on behalf of Tabitha Galavan to kill James Gordon after the previous assassins were killed during a shootout at Theo Galavan's apartment. Gordon goes down to confront Flamingo after he killed the police officers that arrived for his backup. He is beaten by Gordon outside of the apartment building. Gordon contemplated shooting Flamingo in the mouth upon his defeat, but Gordon decides not to. Flamingo is arrested by the arriving police. While being taken to lockup, Eduardo fakes a partial collapse and kills a police officer named Officer Katherine Parks by biting her neck, despite the efforts of the other police officers to get Flamingo off of her. Gordon later receives a call from Detective Alvarez about what Eduardo Flamingo did.
 Flamingo is mentioned in the Batwoman episode "A Lesson from Professor Pyg". When Batwoman and Alice find a corpse with a whip nearby, Alice informs Renee Montoya that Flamingo was responsible after dismissing earlier theories that either Catwoman, Magpie, Whip, Talia al Ghul, or Poison Ivy were responsible.

References

External links
 Flamingo at DC Comics Wiki
 Flamingo at Comic Vine

DC Comics supervillains
Comics characters introduced in 2009
Fictional serial killers
Fictional cannibals
Fictional whip users
Characters created by Grant Morrison
Characters created by Frank Quitely